Asunción Domenech Domínguez (born 8 June 1967) is a Spanish former volleyball player who competed in the 1992 Summer Olympics.

References

External links 
 
 

1967 births
Living people
Spanish women's volleyball players
Olympic volleyball players of Spain
Volleyball players at the 1992 Summer Olympics
Sportspeople from Valencia